In mathematics, the Minkowski question-mark function, denoted , is a function with unusual fractal properties, defined by Hermann Minkowski in 1904. It maps quadratic irrational numbers to rational numbers on the unit interval, via an expression relating the continued fraction expansions of the quadratics to the binary expansions of the rationals, given by Arnaud Denjoy in 1938. It also maps rational numbers to dyadic rationals, as can be seen by a recursive definition closely related to the Stern–Brocot tree.

Definition and intuition
One way to define the question-mark function involves the correspondence between two different ways of representing fractional numbers using finite or infinite binary sequences. Most familiarly, a string of 0's and 1's with a single point mark ".", like "11.001001000011111..." can be interpreted as the binary representation of a number. In this case this number is

There is a different way of interpreting the same sequence, however, using continued fractions. 
Interpreting the part before the point mark as a binary number in the same way, replace each consecutive block of 0's or 1's after the point by its run length, in this case generating the sequence . Then, use this sequence as the coefficients of a continued fraction:

The question-mark function reverses this process: it translates the continued-fraction of a given real number into a run-length encoded binary sequence, and then reinterprets that sequence as a binary number. For instance, for the example above, . To define this formally, if an irrational number  has the (non-terminating) continued-fraction representation

In the same way, if a rational number  has the terminating continued-fraction representation  then 

Analogously to the way the question-mark function reinterprets continued fractions as binary numbers, the Cantor function can be understood as reinterpreting ternary numbers as binary numbers.

Self-symmetry
The question mark is clearly visually self-similar. A monoid of self-similarities may be generated by two operators  and  acting on the unit square and defined as follows:

Visually,  shrinks the unit square to its bottom-left quarter, while  performs a point reflection through its center.

These two operators may be repeatedly combined, forming a monoid. A general element of the monoid is then

for positive integers . Each such element describes a self-similarity of the question-mark function. This monoid is sometimes called the period-doubling monoid, and all period-doubling fractal curves have a self-symmetry described by it (the de Rham curve, of which the question mark is a special case, is a category of such curves). Since both

and

are linear fractional transformations with integer coefficients, the monoid may be regarded as a subset of the modular group .

Quadratic irrationals
The question mark function provides a one-to-one mapping from the non-dyadic rationals to the quadratic irrationals, thus allowing an explicit proof of countability of the latter. These can, in fact, be understood to correspond to the periodic orbits for the dyadic transformation. This can be explicitly demonstrated in just a few steps.

Dyadic symmetry
Define two moves: a left move and a right move, valid on the unit interval  as
 and 
and
 and 
The question mark function then obeys a left-move symmetry

and a right-move symmetry

where  denotes function composition. These can be arbitrary concatenated. Consider, for example, the sequence of left-right moves  Adding the subscripts C and D, and, for clarity, dropping the composition operator  in all but a few places, one has:

Arbitrary finite-length strings in the letters L and R correspond to the dyadic rationals, in that every dyadic rational can be written as both  for integer n and m and as finite length of bits  with  Thus, every dyadic rational is in one-to-one correspondence with some self-symmetry of the question mark function.

Some notational rearrangements can make the above slightly easier to express. Let  and  stand for L and R. Function composition extends this to a monoid, in that one can write  and generally,  for some binary strings of digits A, B, where AB is just the ordinary concatenation of such strings.  The dyadic monoid M is then the monoid of all such finite-length left-right moves. Writing  as a general element of the monoid, there is a corresponding self-symmetry of the question mark function:

Isomorphism
An explicit mapping between the rationals and the dyadic rationals can be obtained providing a reflection operator

and noting that both
 and 
The equivalent sequence of  moves, evaluated at  gives a rational number  It is explicitly the one provided by the continued fraction  keeping in mind that it is a rational because the sequence  was of finite length. This establishes a one-to-one correspondence between the dyadic rationals and the rationals.

Periodic orbits of the dyadic transform
Consider now the periodic orbits of the dyadic transformation. These correspond to bit-sequences consisting of a finite initial "chaotic" sequence of bits , followed by a repeating string  of length . Such repeating strings correspond to a rational number. This is easily made explicit. Write

one then clearly has

Tacking on the initial non-repeating sequence, one clearly has a rational number. In fact, every rational number can be expressed in this way: an initial "random" sequence, followed by a cycling repeat.  That is, the periodic orbits of the map are in one-to-one correspondence with the rationals.

Periodic orbits as continued fractions
Such periodic orbits have an equivalent periodic continued fraction, per the isomorphism established above. There is an initial "chaotic" orbit, of some finite length, followed by a repeating sequence. The repeating sequence generates a periodic continued fraction satisfying   This continued fraction has the form

with the  being integers, and satisfying  Explicit values can be obtained by writing 

for the shift, so that 

while the reflection is given by

so that .  Both of these matrices are unimodular, arbitrary products remain unimodular, and result in a matrix of the form

giving the precise value of the continued fraction. As all of the matrix entries are integers, this matrix belongs to the projective modular group 

Solving explicitly, one has that  It is not hard to verify that the solutions to this meet the definition of quadratic irrationals.  In fact, every quadratic irrational can be expressed in this way. Thus the quadratic irrationals are in one-to-one correspondence with the periodic orbits of the dyadic transform, which are in one-to-one correspondence with the (non-dyadic) rationals, which are in one-to-one correspondence with the dyadic rationals. The question mark function provides the correspondence in each case.

Properties of 

The question-mark function is a strictly increasing and continuous, but not absolutely continuous function. There are several constructions for a measure that, when integrated, yields the question-mark function. One such construction is obtained by measuring the density of the Farey numbers on the real number line. The question-mark measure is the prototypical example of what are sometimes referred to as multi-fractal measures.

The question-mark function maps rational numbers to dyadic rational numbers, meaning those whose base two representation terminates, as may be proven by induction from the recursive construction outlined above. It maps quadratic irrationals to non-dyadic rational numbers. In both cases it provides an order isomorphism between these sets, making concrete Cantor's isomorphism theorem according to which every two unbounded countable dense linear orders are order-isomorphic. It is an odd function, and satisfies the functional equation ; consequently  is an odd periodic function with period one. If  is irrational, then  is either algebraic of degree greater than two, or transcendental.

The question-mark function has fixed points at 0,  and 1, and at least two more, symmetric about the midpoint.  One is approximately 0.42037.
It was conjectured by Moshchevitin that they were the only 5 fixed points.

In 1943, Raphaël Salem raised the question of whether the Fourier–Stieltjes coefficients of the question-mark function vanish at infinity. In other words, he wanted to know whether or not

This was answered affirmatively by Jordan and Sahlsten, as a special case of a result on Gibbs measures.

The graph of Minkowski question mark function is a special case of fractal curves known as de Rham curves.

Algorithm
The recursive definition naturally lends itself to an algorithm for computing the function to any desired degree of accuracy for any real number, as the following C function demonstrates. As long as the loop invariant  remains satisfied there is no need to reduce the fraction , since it is already in lowest terms. The for loop in this program may be analyzed somewhat like a while loop, with the conditional break statements in the first three lines making out the condition. The only statements in the loop that can possibly affect the invariants are in the last two lines, and these can be shown to preserve the truth of both invariants as long as the first three lines have executed successfully without breaking out of the loop.

To prove termination, it is sufficient to note that the sum q + s increases by at least 1 with every iteration of the loop, and that the loop will terminate when this sum is too large to be represented in the primitive C data type long.  However, in practice, the conditional break when y + d == y is what ensures the termination of the loop in a reasonable amount of time.

/* Minkowski's question-mark function */
double minkowski(double x) {
    long p = x;
    long q = 1, r = p + 1, s = 1, m, n;
    double d = 1, y = p;
    if (x < p || (p < 0) ^ (r <= 0))
        return x; /* out of range ?(x) =~ x */
    for (;;) { /* invariants: q * r - p * s == 1 && p / q <= x && x < r / s */
        d /= 2;
        if (y + d == y)
            break; /* reached max possible precision */
        m = p + r;
        if ((m < 0) ^ (p < 0))
            break; /* sum overflowed */
        n = q + s;
        if (n < 0)
            break; /* sum overflowed */

        if (x < (double)m / n) {
            r = m;
            s = n;
        } else {
            y += d;
            p = m;
            q = n;
        }
    }
    return y + d; /* final round-off */
}

Probability distribution

Restricting the  Minkowski question mark function to  ?:[0,1] → [0,1], it can be used as the cumulative distribution function of a singular distribution on the unit interval.  This distribution is symmetric about its midpoint, with raw moments of about m1 = 0.5, m2 = 0.290926, m3 = 0.186389 and m4 = 0.126992, and so a mean and median of 0.5, a standard deviation of about 0.2023, a skewness of 0, and an excess kurtosis about -1.147.

See also
 Pompeiu derivative

References

Notes

Historical sources

Bibliography

; reprinted by Dover Publications, 1997

Further reading

External links
 An extensive bibliography list 

 Simple IEEE 754 implementation in C++

De Rham curves
Continued fractions
Special functions
Theory of continuous functions
Articles with example C code
Hermann Minkowski